Colin Campbell (20 February 1883 – 23 May 1972) was a footballer who played international football for both Argentina and Chile. Campbell played club football for Santiago National and was a Chilean squad member at the Copa Centenario Revolución de Mayo in 1910. His sons Donald and Ian both played rugby for Chile.

References

Argentine footballers
Association football forwards
Argentina international footballers
Chilean footballers
Chile international footballers
Dual internationalists (football)
Estudiantes de La Plata footballers
Santiago National F.C. players
Chilean people of Scottish descent
Naturalized citizens of Chile
1883 births
1972 deaths
Footballers from Buenos Aires
Argentine emigrants to Chile